Arthur Andrew "Bunny" Corcoran (November 23, 1894 – July 27, 1958) was a professional football player in the National Football League (NFL) with the Canton Bulldogs, Cleveland Indians, Akron Pros and the Buffalo All-Americans. He also played on the pre-NFL era, Frankford Yellow Jackets and the Canton Bulldogs of the "Ohio League".

Aside from football, Art also a professional baseball player for the Philadelphia Athletics of the American League in 1915. He played in only one major league  game for the Athletics.

Head coaching record

Notes

References

Additioanl sources

External links
 
 
 

1894 births
1958 deaths
American football ends
Akron Pros players
Buffalo All-Americans players
Canton Bulldogs players
Canton Bulldogs (Ohio League) players
Cleveland Indians (NFL) players
Frankford Yellow Jackets players
Holy Cross Crusaders football coaches
Georgetown Hoyas football players
Norfolk Mary Janes players
Petersburg Goobers players
Philadelphia Athletics players
Rocky Mount Tar Heels players
Tarboro Tarbabies players
People from Roxbury, Boston
Baseball players from Boston
Coaches of American football from Massachusetts
Players of American football from Boston